Johan Herbert Magnus Härenstam (19 June 1941 – 13 June 2015) was a Swedish television host, actor and comedian. Härenstam hosted the Swedish version of the game-show Jeopardy! for 14 years before being replaced by Adam Alsing. Härenstam is also known for hosting the children's TV-program Fem myror är fler än fyra elefanter (with Brasse Brännström & Eva Remaeus), which was very popular and has been re-broadcast numerous times since it first aired. Härenstam participated in the music video for ABBA's hit song "When I Kissed the Teacher" where he played the teacher who got kissed by Agnetha Fältskog. Well known in Sweden for several decades, he was almost equally popular in Norway, having starred in the 1990s sitcom Fredrikssons fabrikk, playing the Swedish boss of a Norwegian textile workshop.

Härenstam died on 13 June 2015 after a several-year-long fight with cancer, six days before his 74th birthday.

Partial filmography

Skratt (1968, TV Short)
Oj, är det redan fredag? (1970, TV Series)
Fem myror är fler än fyra elefanter (1973, TV Series) - Magnus
Pappas pojkar (1973, TV Series) - Martin Bengtsson
Fimpen (1974) - Mackan
Levande på Nya Bacchi (1974, Theatre)
En kille och en tjej (1975) - Party Guest
Kamrer Gunnarsson i skärgården (1976, TV Movie) - Kamrer Gunnarsson
Varning för barn (1976, Theatre)
When I Kissed the Teacher (1976, Video short) - The Teacher
Skyll inte på mig! (1978, TV Series) - Magnus
Det är serverat (1978, Theatre)
The Adventures of Picasso (1978) - Hitler
Jag är med barn (1979) - De unga älskande - Bosse
Magnus och Brasse Show (1980, TV Series)
Sällskapsresan (1980) - Dr. B. A:son Levander
Sopor (1981) - Ulf Adelsohn
Tuppen (1981) - Cederqvist
Göta kanal eller Vem drog ur proppen (1981) - Kronofogden
Svenska Sesam (1981, Swedish version of Sesame Street)
En flicka på halsen (1982) - Hot Dog Vendor
Två killar och en tjej (1983) - Klasse Wallin
Jokerfejs (1984)
Hemma hoz (1985, TV Mini-Series)
Bombardemagnus (1985)
Card Sharks (1987–1990, TV Series)
Macken - Roy's & Roger's Bilservice (1990) - Edvard
Fredrikssons fabrikk (1990–1993, TV Series) - Direktør Hasse Fredriksson
Jeopardy! (1991–2005, TV Series) - Television host
Fredrikssons fabrik – The movie (1994) - Fredriksson
Bert: The Last Virgin (1995) - Roland Ebert
Vuxna människor (1999) - Frank's boss
Tarzan (1999, Swedish dub)
Hälsoresan – En smal film av stor vikt (1999) - Dr. Levander
Karlsson på taket (2002) - Filip, thief (voice)
The Incredibles (2005, Swedish dub)
Winners and Losers (2005) - Himself
Muntergökarna (2005, Theatre)
Lite som du (2005-2006, TV Series) - Ralf Sundin
Sigillet (2006) - Rektor Magnificus
Cars (2006, Swedish dub)
Göta kanal 2 – Kanalkampen (2006) - Peter Black
Stjärnorna på slottet (2007)
Göta kanal 3 – Kanalkungens hemlighet (2009) - Peter Black
Vem tror du att du är? (2009)
Up (2009, Narrator in Swedish version)
Bamse and the Thief City (2014) - Reinard Räv (voice)

References

External links

1941 births
2015 deaths
People from Västervik Municipality
Swedish television hosts
Swedish comedians
Swedish male actors
Swedish male voice actors
Deaths from spinal cancer
Deaths from cancer in Sweden
Neurological disease deaths in Sweden
20th-century Swedish people